The 2015–16 First League of the Federation of Bosnia and Herzegovina was the twenty-first season of the First League of the Federation of Bosnia and Herzegovina, the second tier football league of Bosnia and Herzegovina, since its original establishment and the sixteenth as a unified federation-wide league. It began on 8 August 2015 and ended on 4 June 2016. Mladost Doboj Kakanj were the last champions, having won their first championship title in the 2014–15 season and earning a promotion to Premier League of Bosnia and Herzegovina.

Teams

League table

Statistics

Top goalscorers

References

External links
Official site for the Football Federation of Bosnia and Herzegovina
Official site for the Football Federation of the Federation of Bosnia and Herzegovina
2015–16 First League of the Federation of Bosnia and Herzegovina at Soccerway

2
Bos
First League of the Federation of Bosnia and Herzegovina seasons